Jean Charles Joseph, Count of Merode, Marquess of Deynze was a noble of the Austrian Netherlands, born in the Prince-Bishopric of Liège. He was Lieutenant-Feldmarschall of the Holy Roman Empire, Knight of the Order of the Golden Fleece.

Biography 
He was born in the family castle of Ham-sur-Heure, Prince-Bishopric of Liège on 3 December 1719. He was the second and eldest surviving son of Joachim Maximilien of Mérode, Marquess of Deynze by his first wife and 2nd cousin, Thérèse-Jeanne, countess of Mérode-Nalinnes.

His elder brother, Maximilien Louis being dead in 1728 and his father having left no will when he died in 1740, he inherited his whole succession, as the surviving eldest son.

He married, on 12 January 1744 in Heverlee's Arenberg Castle, Marie Flore Charlotte Thérèse, princess of Arenberg, 3rd daughter of Léopold Philippe d'Arenberg, 4th Duke of Arenberg, Dame of the Order of the Starry Cross but had no descent.

He was appointed Colonel (Commander-in-Chief) of the Regiment of Los Rios (1745-1751), General-major (1751), Lieutenant-Feldmarschall of the Holy Roman Empire

He was Grand Bailiff of the Quarter of Entre-Sambre-et-Meuse of the Prince-Bishopric of Liège.

His Regiment of Los Rios participated in the Battle of Rocourt and covered the retreat of the Dutch infantry. It participated in the Battle of Lauffeld. With the same Regiment, he defended the city of Maastricht, during the Siege of Maastricht (1748), led by the Maréchal of France Maurice de Saxe. It caused heavy losses to the French army during the heroic night of 1–2 May 1748.

He was also a co-director and financial supporter (1750-1752) of the Théatre de la Monnaie in Brussels, together with his father-in-law and the Duke of Ursel. See List of directors of the Théâtre de la Monnaie

His half-brother Balthazar-Philippe of Mérode, Lord of Rixensart inherited his lordships when he died in Ham-sur-Heure Castle on 10 August 1774.

Honours 
  : 785th Knight of the Order of the Golden Fleece (Austrian Branch) (appointed in 1765, by Joseph II, Holy Roman Emperor)  The jewel of his Golden Fleece is inserted into the Grand Ostensoir (Monstrance) of  Saint Martin Church in Ham-sur-Heure.
  (Austrian Netherlands) : Chamberlain of TT.II.& RR. Majesties.

Titles 
 Marquess of Deynze
 Count of Mérode, of Montfort
 Viscount of Wavremont
 Baron of Duffel
 Lord of Crupet, Ham-sur-Heure, Nalinnes, Groesbeek, Morialmé, Sautour, Solre-sur-Sambre
 Hereditary Haut-Avoué of Fosses-la-Ville.

Ancestors
His ancestry shows a high level of members of his own House of Mérode

References 

Field marshals of Austria
Je
Knights of the Golden Fleece
Nobility of the Austrian Netherlands
1719 births
1774 deaths
18th-century Austrian people